Lisang Pacidal Koyouan, better known by her stage name A-Lin, is a Taiwanese aboriginal singer and songwriter of Amis descent.

Career
In 1999, when A-Lin was 16 years old and taught children to sing the hymn "Amazing Grace" after the 1999 Jiji earthquake in Nantou County, she was discovered by her former agent. However, he was not available when she wanted to give him contact information. Fortunately, four years later, A-Lin met him again in a bar where she sang regularly. She was officially offered a singing contract.

A-Lin made her debut in the world of music at the end of 2006, achieving rapid commercial success. She has been called the next A-Mei, who is an aboriginal singer of Puyuma descent. She also got the nickname 天生歌姬, meaning "A Born Diva". A-Lin was often quoted as saying that A-Mei is highly influential to her music and often covers A-Mei's songs in music shows and concerts. A-Lin has won numerous music awards and is extremely popular within Mandarin-speaking world.

A-Lin has performed internationally and at a sold-out concert with Xiao Yu and Shin in 2012 at the Sydney Town Hall. It was her first visit to Sydney and people flew in from different cities just to see her.

In 2013, with Avex Taiwan exiting the market due to overall poor sales from the records, all singers under Avex like Huang Li-ling were allowed to terminate their contracts early.

After terminating her contract, A-Lin signed with her new label Sony Music. In December 2014, she released her first album after leaving Avex. This album was nominated for Best Mandarin Female Singer, making her fourth nomination without any win.

In 2015, she participated in the third season of I Am a Singer and came in sixth on the finale held in March 2015. As a result, her singing ability was recognized by more people and provided a boost to her career.

Style
While A-Lin considers herself as a Contralto, she has been noted to have an extremely wide vocal range closely identical to that of Amanda Seyfried, as noted in many of her songs to have over two octaves or more, and in the concert in Auckland, New Zealand, she was suffering from illnesses that made her unable to hit her falsetto range. She has also notably performed "Remember", by A-Mei, in infantile speech.

Personal life
A-Lin is the youngest in her family. Her parents are Roman Catholics and love music. A-Lin's older sister is Taiwanese model Luji Huang, who entered the Super Star competition in Taiwan in July 2013 as an aspiring singer in her own right. In 2015, after A-Lin entered I Am A Singer, Lea became a contestant for 'The most beautiful harmonies' (最美和聲). They also have an older brother, and A-Lin's cousin-in-law is her fitness coach and also a guitarist. A-Lin was extremely popular as a student and the confidence she gained from this led to her decision to compete in a 'Singing Strength Elite Rivalry Competition' [歌唱實力精英角逐比賽]. She chose the hit song 'At least you are still there' [至少還有你], by Sandy Lam, and the competition allowed A-Lin to believe she had a future as a professional singer. In reference to talent shows being readily accessible to young people these days, A-Lin commented, "I am impressed that there is now a Million Star-type of singing platform, which allows both everyone who enjoys singing and those who are talented singers a tough but realistic chance - an accomplished dream." They also have a brother.

On 1 July 2007, A-Lin married Huang Kan-lin, a well-known Taiwanese baseball player. They have a daughter, Huang Qiaoyu. (A-Lin said: "At the first time Huang Kan-lin requested a song "How Do I Live"  by LeAnn Rimes in her Tainan Pub Session. However, at that time because of his poor English, he wrote “Good Do A-Lin " on a piece of paper and then spelled the song in homophonic Mandarin. The implication was that he wanted to chase after A-Lin because of her rich lips. Eventually, Huang Kan-lin proposed to A-Lin successfully by a new recorded song "愛情問怎麼走 (How Love Will Go)").

Discography

Filmography

Film

Awards and nominations

References

External links

 A-Lin's Sina Weibo Page 

1983 births
Amis people
Living people
Avex Group artists
Sony BMG artists
21st-century Taiwanese singers
Taiwanese Mandopop singers
Musicians from Kaohsiung
Taiwanese Roman Catholics
21st-century Taiwanese women singers